Arbing is a municipality in the district Perg in the Austrian state of Upper Austria.

Geography
Arbing is located in the lower Mühlviertel at the transition from the fertile hills of the Mühlviertel Machlande level of the Danube. The extension is 4.4 kilometers from north to south, from west to east is also 4.4 kilometers. The total area is 12 square kilometers. 17.5 percent of the area is forested, 71.7 percent of the area are used for agriculture. Quarters are: Arbing, Frühstorf, Groißing, Hummelberg, Puchberg in Machland, Roisenberg. Some parts of other villages also belong to the municipality Arbing (Mollnegg, Hehenberger)

Population

References

External links
 Official site

Cities and towns in Perg District